Rennertshofen is a municipality in the district of Neuburg-Schrobenhausen in Bavaria in Germany. It consists of the following 28 Ortsteile: Altstetten, Ammerfeld, Antoniberg, Asbrunn, Bertoldsheim, Dittenfeld, Dünsberg, Ellenbrunn, Emskeim, Erlbach, Feldmühle, Gallenmühle, Giglberg, Hatzenhofen, Hundertthalermühle, Hütting, Kienberg, Mauern, Rennertshofen, Riedensheim, Rohrbach, Siglohe, Sprößlmühle, Stepperg, Störzelmühle, Treidelheim, Trugenhofen and Wolpertsau.

References

Neuburg-Schrobenhausen